Group 8 consisted of three of the 32 teams entered into the European zone: Czechoslovakia, Denmark, and Scotland. These three teams competed on a home-and-away basis for one of the 9.5 spots in the final tournament allocated to the European zone, with the group's winner claiming the place in the finals.

Standings

Matches

Notes

External links 
Group 8 Detailed Results at RSSSF

8
1972–73 in Czechoslovak football
1973–74 in Czechoslovak football
1972 in Danish football
1973 in Danish football
1972–73 in Scottish football
1973–74 in Scottish football